A gas appliance is any appliance that uses natural gas, propane, hydrogen, etc as its power source rather than electricity. They are commonly used for space heating, water heating, cooking, and the like.

Cooking appliances 
Oven
Gas stove

Water heater 
Water heating

Heater 
fan heater
Central heating
heat pump
air conditioner
fireplace
Gas heater

Clothes Dryer 
Clothes dryer

Residential heating appliances
Gas technologies